Brigitte Evelyne Granville is an economist with dual French and British nationality.  She is Professor of International Economics and Economic Policy in the School of Business and Management at Queen Mary University of London. She founded the Centre for Globalisation Research (CGR).

Granville is the author of several economics essays; the best known of these, Remembering Inflation (2013) has been widely cited by economists.  Granville is known for her work on macroeconomics and public finance and for her comprehensive articles on the subject of economics She has written articles for Bloomberg News, the Financial Times, Le Monde and other economic press. Granville is a regular columnist of Project Syndicate. Her book What Ails France? was published in April 2021 by McGill-Queen’s University Press, which described this work as “a wide-ranging survey of the political economy of contemporary France”, applying an economist’s vision to research from other disciplines to fuel “a provocative and at times contentious analysis”. This book has been praised in the Financial Times  in the UK, Les Echos in France  and the Washington Post in the US.

In addition to her academic research in macroeconomics and public finance, Granville has written articles for Bloomberg News, the Financial Times, Le Monde and other media publications. Granville is a regular columnist of Project Syndicate and The Conversation.

Early life and education
Granville earned a Maitrise en Sciences Economiques diploma (M.Econ. equivalent) in  1979 at University of Burgundy in Dijon, France. She then earned an MPhil in development studies from the Institute of Development Studies (1980–82), University of Sussex, and then attended the European University Institute (Ph.D, 1997). and was also a summer intern at the World Bank in 1982 and stagiaire at the European Economic Commission from 1987 to 1988.

Career 
From 1992 to 1994, Granville served as a member of the "Monetary & Financial Unit" (MFU) as Economic Adviser to the Ministry of Finance of the Russian Government. As an analyst she worked with the Central Bank and the banking system, publishing a weekly report called "Monetary Report" on the main macro indicators of the economy and provided analytical support to Russian policymakers on  the 1993 Monetary reform in Russia and the question of how to deal with Post-Soviet ruble following the breakup of the Soviet Union in 1991.

She then served as Senior Expert at the Russian European Centre for Economic Policy (RECEP) from 1994 through 1997 as Economic Adviser to the  Government of the  Russian Federation and as associate professor at the New Economic School in Moscow. From 1994 to 1995, Granville served as adviser to the  Government of Ukraine.

From September 1997 to June 1998 she was vice president for Russia at J. P. Morgan.

Brigitte Granville worked in the Chatham House think tank, a non-profit, non-governmental organization based in London whose mission is to analyse and promote the understanding of major international issues and current affairs. She served as Senior Research Fellow, International Economics Programme from 1994 to 1997 and later as Head of the International Economics Programme from January 1999 to December 2003.

In 2002, she was nominated for the Carolyn Shaw Bell Award of the  American Economic Association, a prize awarded annually to an individual who has furthered the status of women in the economics profession.

In 2007, Granville was appointed a Chevalier in the Ordre des Palmes Académiques, a decoration awarded by the French government for services to education.

Consultancy 
World Bank (1982–1983), Ministry of Finance of the Russian Government (1991–1994), Government of Ukraine (1994–1995), Russian European Centre for Economic Policy (RECEP) (1994–1997), Central Bank of Uzbekistan (2003), St Antony's/FIRS group, Oxford University, on research for the National Bank of Kazakhstan (2005–2006).

Editorial roles 
Brigitte Granville is a reviewer for the following journals: Cambridge Journal of Economics, Cambridge University Press, Comparative Economic Studies, Economic Systems, Economy and Society, Emerging markets Finance and Trade, Empirical Economics, International Affairs, International Finance, International Review of Administrative Sciences, International Review of Economics and Finance, Journal of Economic History, Open Economies Review, Pacifica Review, Public Finance and Management, Understanding Global Issues, World Development. 

She has also collaborated with Cambridge University Press, Manchester University Press, Oxford University Press, Penguin Press.

Charity 
She is a Trustee of Effective Intervention (EI) a UK-registered non-governmental organization involved in research-focused projects on infant mortality and primary education in some of the poorest regions of India, Guinea-Bissau and Gambia.

Personal life
She is married to Managing Director of TS Lombard, Christopher Granville

Publications

Books
Granville, Brigitte (2021). What ails France, McGill-Queen’s University Press, ISBN 9780228006800

Selected essays and articles
Factor prices and induced technical change in the Industrial Revolution, (with Ravshonbek Otojanov and Roger Fouquet), The Economic History Review, 2022: 1-25, September. https://doi.org/10.1111/ehr.13194
Does greater Financial Openness promote external competitiveness in emerging markets? The role of institutional quality, (with Zunaira Aman, Sushanta Mallick and, Ilayda Nemlioglu), International Journal of Finance and Economics, 2022: 1-25, September.  https://doi.org/10.1002/ijfe.2695
Choosing the Optimal Tool for Fiscal Adjustment or Living under Fiscal Constraints: Panel Evidence from Selected OECD Countries (with Cagri Esener and Roman Matousek), Economic Research Guardian, Weissberg Publishing, 12(1), 2022: 2-29, June. https://ideas.repec.org/a/wei/journl/v12y2022i1p2-29.html
Time variation in inflation persistence: new evidence from modelling US Inflation (with Ning Zeng), Economic Modelling, Volume 81, September 2019: 30-39, https://doi.org/10.1016/j.econmod.2018.12.004
The euro is doomed, Inference, Volume 4, Issue 3, March 2019 In response to “One Euro, One Europe” (Vol. 4, No. 2). https://inference-review.com.
Withdrawal of Italy from the euro area: stochastic simulations of a structural macroeconometric model (with Alberto Bagnai and Christian A. Mongeau Ospina), Economic Modelling, 2017. 64: 524-538. https://doi.org/10.1016/j.econmod.2017.04.010
Eurozone cycles: an analysis of phase synchronization, (with Sana Hussain), International Journal of Finance and Economics, 2017. 22: 83-114.  https://doi.org/10.1002/ijfe.1576 
Conflicting incentives for the public to support the EMU, (with Dominik Nagly), The Manchester School, 2015: 142-157. Doi: 10.1111/manc.12108.

References

External links 
 Faculty profile at London University
 Profile and Papers at Research Papers in Economics/RePEc
 Column archive at Project Syndicate

University of Burgundy alumni
Macroeconomists
Living people
French economists
French women economists
Public economists
Chatham House people
1957 births